Laciris pelagicus is a species of poeciliid found in the Democratic Republic of the Congo and Uganda. It is endemic to Lake Edward where it is found near the surface in open water. It was formerly included in Micropanchax, but recently, authorities have moved it to the monotypic genus Laciris.

References

Poeciliidae
Lake Edward
Taxonomy articles created by Polbot
Taxobox binomials not recognized by IUCN